Emmanuel "Boybits" Victoria (1972/1973 – March 1, 2023) was a Filipino professional basketball player.

Career
Victoria played for the RFM and San Miguel franchise teams when he was plying in the Philippine Basketball Association (PBA). Prior to entering the PBA, he was a player for the San Beda Red Lions in college.

Swift and Sunkist
Victoria entered the PBA through the 1994 draft where he was selected by the RFM franchise team, then-named the Swift Mighty Meaties (later Sunkist Orange Juicers/Bottlers), as the third overall pick. He helped the team clinch the 1995 All-Filipino and Commissioner's Cup titles. 

Due to poor relations with coach Norman Black, Victoria forced the team (now the Pop Cola Bottlers) to trade him to another team.

San Miguel
Victoria was acquired by the San Miguel Beermen in 1998 under coach Jong Uichico, where he fulfilled the role as backup to Olsen Racela. He was part of the team until 2001. During his stay, San Miguel clinched five PBA titles.

PBA career statistics

Season-by-season averages

Later life and death
Victoria turned to coaching and later as an analyst of PBA games for radio and television broadcast. He also became head of sales of Victoria Sports, a Quezon City-based indoor sports club.

Victoria was diagnosed with a Guillain–Barré syndrome, an autoimmune disorder, in 2018. His condition improved after spending weeks confined in a hospital. He suffered a heart attack on February 14, 2023, and he was discovered to have an acute myocardial infarction. Victoria died on March 1, 2023, after another heart attack while at the San Juan de Dios Hospital in Pasay, Philippines. He was 50.

References

1970s births
Year of birth uncertain
2023 deaths
Filipino men's basketball players
San Miguel Beermen players
San Beda Red Lions basketball players
Pop Cola Panthers players
Pop Cola Panthers draft picks
Point guards